Prasophyllum taphanyx, commonly known as the graveside leek orchid, is a species of orchid endemic to a small area of Tasmania. It has a single tubular, green leaf and up to twenty five small, light green, pinkish-cream and purplish flowers. It rarely flowers and the largest number of flowers seen in any one year was three in 2001.

Description
There is a broad, shiny green callus in the centre of the labellum and extending almost to its tip. Flowering occurs in October and November.

Taxonomy and naming
Prasophyllum taphanyx was first formally described in 2004 by David Jones from a specimen collected in a cemetery in Campbell Town and the description was published in The Orchadian. The specific epithet (taphanyx) is derived from the Ancient Greek words taphos meaning "grave" or "tomb" and antyx meaning "edge" or "rim", reflecting where the species is found and its "perilous predicament".

Distribution and habitat
The graveside leek orchid is only known from three plants in remnant native grassland.

Conservation
This orchid is classed as "Endangered" under the Tasmanian Threatened Species Protection Act 1995 and as Critically Endangered under the Commonwealth Government Environment Protection and Biodiversity Conservation Act 1999 (EPBC) Act. The main threats to the species are its critically small population, land clearing and pasture improvement, inappropriate weed control and grazing, mowing or fire during the flowering period.

References

External links 
 

taphanyx
Flora of Tasmania
Endemic orchids of Australia
Plants described in 2004